Diofior (or Dioffior) is a commune in Fatick Department in Senegal.

References 

Populated places in Fatick Region
Communes of Senegal